Got Game Entertainment, LLC was an American developer and publisher of videogames, based in Weston, Connecticut.  Got Game chiefly published adventure games, with ARMA II being the most notable exception. In January 2011, founder Howard Horowitz reorganized Got Game Entertainment.

Games published 
ARMA 2
Bad Mojo Redux
Barrow Hill: Curse of the Ancient Circle
Capri series (the first two games, A Quiet Weekend in Capri and AnaCapri: The Dream, were published by Got Game)
Nick Delios - Conspiracies
DarkSpace
Memento Mori
Nikopol: Secrets of the Immortals
Puzzle Scape
RHEM
RHEM 2: The Cave
RHEM 3: The Secret Library
Scratches
The Lost Crown: A Ghost-Hunting Adventure
Tony Tough and the Night of Roasted Moths
Twin Sector
WorldShift

References

Defunct video game companies of the United States
Video game publishers
Privately held companies based in Connecticut
Companies based in Fairfield County, Connecticut
Weston, Connecticut
Defunct companies based in Connecticut